Zhunan is a railway station in Miaoli County, Taiwan served by Taiwan Railways. It lies at the northern junction of the Mountain and Coast lines of the West Coast line.

Overview
The station has three island platforms. Although it is a first-class station, the Taroko Express, a variant of the Tzu-Chiang Limited Express which passes through the Taichung line (Mountain line), does not stop at this station.

History

It was a wooden station building.
1903-05-25: The section to Byōritsu opened for service.
1920-10-01: The station name was changed to "Chikunan Station".
Due to its location on the Coastal line, the station was upgraded to a first-class station.
1935-11-06: Due to the earthquake on 1935-04-24, the station is reconstructed as a concrete building.
1943-04: The new southern station building is constructed.
1949-09: The new northern station building is constructed.
1995-05-22: As part of the double-tracking construction for the Mountain line, the station structure is demolished.
1997-01-01: The new station opens for service.
2001: The southern station building is demolished and relocated to Jiji.
2007-11: The northern part of the new station is completed.
2009-01: The southern part of the new station is completed.
2009-08-15: The entire station is completed and begins service.
2011-02-26: Due to the celebration of the Taiwan Lantern Festival, the station sets a single-day record of 160,000 passengers.

Station layout

Around the station
 Asia-Pacific Institute of Creativity
 Zhonggang Cihyu Temple

See also
West Coast line (Taiwan)
Taichung line

References

External links

 Zhunan Station (English)

1902 establishments in Taiwan
Railway stations in Miaoli County
Railway stations opened in 1902
Railway stations served by Taiwan Railways Administration